Lacus Timoris  (Latin timōris, "Lake of Fear") is a small lunar mare on the Moon. It is located at 39.4° S, 27.9° W and is 154 km in diameter.

References

Timoris